Celia Viveros (1925–1979) was a Mexican film actress.

Selected filmography
 Women of the Theatre (1951)
 A Galician Dances the Mambo (1951)
 Sacrificed Women (1952)
 I Want to Live (1953)
 The Life of Agustín Lara (1959)
 El dolor de pagar la renta (1960)
 A Faithful Soldier of Pancho Villa (1967)

References

Bibliography 
 Pitts, Michael R. Western Movies: A Guide to 5,105 Feature Films. McFarland, 2012.

External links 
 

1925 births
1979 deaths
Mexican film actresses
People from Mexico City